TOI-677 b (or TOI-677b; "TOI" refers to "Tess Object of Interest") is a confirmed "warm" super-Jupiter exoplanet orbiting TOI-677, its host star, in the Ophiuchus constellation, about  away from Earth. The planet was discovered by NASA's Transiting Exoplanet Survey Satellite (TESS) using the transit method, in which the dimming effect that a planet causes as it crosses in front of its star is measured. Discovery of the exoplanet was announced on 13 November 2019.

Confirmed exoplanet
The planet is very close to its bright (V=9.8 mag) main sequence late F host star (based on solar radius, age, temperature and metallicity), TOI-677, and orbits the star once every 11.24 days in an eccentric orbit (e=0.435).

See also 
 55 Cancri b
 Hot Jupiter
 Kepler-432b

References

External links 

 NASA – TESS Mission

 TOI 677 b at The Extrasolar Planets Encyclopaedia.

Exoplanets discovered in 2019
Transiting exoplanets
Exoplanets discovered by TESS